Morgemoulin is a commune in the Meuse department in Grand Est in north-eastern France.

The village's name comes from the mill belonging to the family "Morge" in 1610. It was destroyed during the 1914-1918 war and rebuilt.

See also
 Communes of the Meuse department

References

Communes of Meuse (department)